Neadmete unalashkensis is a species of sea snail, a marine gastropod mollusk in the family Cancellariidae, the nutmeg snails.

Description
The shell grows to a length of 18 mm.

Distribution
This species occurs in the Pacific Ocean from Alaska to Oregon, USA

References

 Turgeon, D. D., J. F. Quinn, Jr., A. E. Bogan, E. V. Coan, F. G. Hochberg, W. G. Lyons, et al. 1998. Common and scientific names of aquatic invertebrates from the United States and Canada: Mollusks, 2nd ed.. American Fisheries Society Special Publication 26. American Fisheries Society. Bethesda, Maryland, USA. 526. . 
 Petit, R.E. & Harasewych, M.G. (2005) Catalogue of the superfamily Cancellarioidea Forbes and Hanley, 1851 (Gastropoda: Prosobranchia)- 2nd edition. Zootaxa, 1102, 3–161. NIZT 682
 Hemmen J. (2007). Recent Cancellariidae. Wiesbaden, 428pp.

Cancellariidae
Gastropods described in 1873